Lake June station or Lake June Road station is an intermodal transit station in Dallas, Texas. It serves DART Light Rail's  as well as buses. The station initially opened as Lake June Transit Center, as a bus-only facility in 2003. As part of the Green Line's expansion in December 2010, new light rail platforms opened.

References

External links 
Dallas Area Rapid Transit - Lake June Station

Dallas Area Rapid Transit light rail stations in Dallas
Railway stations in the United States opened in 2010
Bus stations in Dallas
Railway stations in Dallas County, Texas
2003 establishments in Texas